Petra Bryant is a Czech actress, who is known for a Los Angeles comedy For the Love of George. Bryant is also the writer and creator of the Girl on a Rocking Horse novel, as well as the TV series of the same name.

Petra Bryant was born in Rychnov nad Kněžnou and grew up in Doudleby nad Orlicí. She has been living in London since 1999 and splits her time between the U.K. and the U.S. whilst filming.

References

Year of birth missing (living people)
20th-century births
Living people
21st-century Czech novelists
21st-century Czech women writers
Czech film actresses
Czech women novelists
People from Rychnov nad Kněžnou